The 2022 NWSL Challenge Cup Championship, the final match of the 2022 NWSL Challenge Cup, was contested by North Carolina Courage and Washington Spirit.

Road to the final

North Carolina Courage won the right to host the final by finishing with the highest seed in the group stages.

Note: In all results below, the score of the finalist is given first.

Match

Details

Broadcasting

Notes

References

External links 
 

2022
2022 in American soccer leagues
2022 National Women's Soccer League season
NWSL
NWSL